The Saint Paul RiverCentre is a convention center located in Saint Paul, Minnesota. It sits adjacent to the Roy Wilkins Auditorium, Xcel Energy Center and the Ordway Center for the Performing Arts.

The convention center opened in 1998. It was designed by Hammel Green and Abrahamson, Inc.

It has twice been honored as "Best Convention Center" by Minnesota Meetings and Events Magazine. It hosts a large variety of events and has been the home of the annual Festival of Nations.

Noted events
2004 National Hockey League All Star FANtasy Event
2006 USA Gymnastics National Championships
2008 Republican National Convention Media Headquarters
Taste of the NFL "Party with a Purpose"
2018 NFL Media Day Site
Education Minnesota's MEA Conference
American Craft Council - Saint Paul Fine Craft Show
Donnie Smith Invitational Bike Show
Festival of Nations
Hmong New Year Celebration
Let's Play Hockey Expo
Minnesota Home & Patio Show
Minnesota Sportsmen's Show
Saint Paul Ice Fishing & Winter Sports Show
Starkey Hearing Foundation's "So the World May Hear" Gala

References

Convention centers in Minnesota
Minneapolis–Saint Paul
Buildings and structures in Saint Paul, Minnesota
1998 establishments in Minnesota